The Brink's Company is an American private security and protection company headquartered outside Richmond, Virginia. Its core business is Brink's Inc.; its sister brand Brink's Home Security company operates separately and is headquartered in Dallas, Texas. In 2013, its international network served customers in more than 100 countries and employed approximately 134,000 people. Operations include approximately 1,100 facilities, and 13,300 vehicles. The company emerged from the Pittston Company and changed its name to the Brink's Company in 2003.

Operations 

Brink's is popularly known for its bullet-resistant armored trucks which carry money and valuable goods (the service once used to transport the Hope Diamond from an auction to the buyer's home). Brink's is a provider of security services to banks, retailers, governments, mints and jewelers. Founded in 1859 by Perry Brink of Chicago, Illinois, Brink's business evolved from local armored transportation services to providing corporate financial logistics and international secure transportation.

In 1962, Brink's was acquired by Pittston, a coal company. Burlington Air Express was acquired in 1982. Brink's Home Security was started in 1983. Pittston sold off its coal assets in the 2000s and renamed the company Brink's. The home security unit was also spun off.

A significant portion of Brink's business is conducted internationally, with 82% of $3.9 billion in revenues earned outside the United States in 2013. The majority of Brink's consolidated revenues in 2013 was earned in operations located in nine countries, each contributing in excess of $100 million of revenues. The 2013 revenues from these countries totaled $3.0 billion or 79% of consolidated revenues. These operations, in declining order of revenues, were the U.S., France, Mexico, Brazil, Venezuela, Canada, Colombia, Argentina and the Netherlands.

In January 2012, Brink's acquired Kheops, SAS, a provider of logistics software and related services in France, for approximately $17 million. This acquisition gave the company proprietary control of software used primarily in cash-in-transit and money processing operations in France.

On January 31, 2013, Brink's acquired Brazil-based Rede Transacoes Eletronicas Ltda. ("Redetrel") for approximately $26 million. Redetrel distributes electronic prepaid products, including mobile phone airtime, via a network of approximately 20,000 retail locations across Brazil. Redetrel's strong distribution network supplements Brink's existing payments business, ePago, which has operations in Brazil, Mexico, Colombia and Panama.

Brink's sold one of its core operations, BAX Global, a shipping company for U.S. $1.1 billion to Deutsche Bahn on January 31, 2006. BAX Global used to be known as Burlington Air Express.

Discontinued operations 

In November 2010, Brink's former cash-in-transit (CIT) operations in Belgium filed for bankruptcy, after local union employees rejected a restructuring plan, and was placed in bankruptcy on February 2, 2011. Brink's deconsolidated the Belgium subsidiary in 2010. However in 2021 returned to Belgium and took over G4S's Cash Solutions division.

In 2012, Brink's agreed to sell its cash-in-transit operations in Germany and Poland, and event security operations in France, and the company completed the divestiture of its guarding operations in Morocco, in December 2012.

In May 2014, Brink's US decided to cease their cash-in-transit operations throughout Australia. Linfox Armaguard made an offer to purchase Brink's Australia's CIT operations, and Brink's is continuing their precious goods logistics business within Australia.

Brink's Home Security 

Brink's had a business line in home security named Brink's Home Security which accounted for 15% of Brink's revenue in 2008; it decided that year to spin the business off into a separate publicly traded company in order to focus on its other businesses. The company rebranded as Broadview in 2009 with a massive advertising campaign. Broadview was acquired and merged into The ADT Corporation in 2010.

In 2018, Brink's re-entered the business through a trademark licensing deal, re-creating the Brinks Home Security brand.

Robberies and incidents

1950 Great Brink's Robbery 

The Great Brink's Robbery was an armed robbery of the Brinks Building at the corner of Prince St. and Commercial St. in the North End of Boston, Massachusetts, on the night of January 17, 1950. Led by Boston small-time criminal Tony "Fats" Pino, 11 men broke in and stole $1,218,211.29 in cash, and $1,557,183.83 in checks, money orders, and other securities. At the time, it was the largest robbery in the history of the United States. Skillfully executed with only a bare minimum of clues left at the crime scene, the robbery was billed as "the crime of the century".

All 11 members of the gang were later arrested, and all were paroled and released by 1971, except for Joseph "Big Joe" McGinnis, the originator of the heist, who died in prison. Despite ongoing efforts by the Federal Bureau of Investigation and local authorities, only $58,000 of the initial $2.7 million stolen was ever recovered.

1981 attempted robbery 

On October 20, 1981, members of the Weather Underground Organization and Black Liberation Army attempted an armed robbery of a Brink's armored car in Nanuet, New York. The robbery resulted in a shootout that left two police officers, Edward O'Grady and Waverly Brown, and a Brink's security guard, Pete Paige, dead. Paige's partner, Joe Trombino, was severely wounded in the gun battle but survived. He later died in the World Trade Center during the September 11 attacks in 2001.

1983 Brink's-Mat robbery 

On November 26, 1983, there was an armed robbery at a warehouse near London's Heathrow Airport, operated by Brink's-Mat, a former joint venture between Brink's and the London-based company MAT Transport, which specialized in the transportation of valuable goods. Three tonnes of gold bullion (worth £26 million) was stolen. Most of the gold has never been recovered.

1993 New York robbery 

On January 5, 1993, $7.4 million was stolen from the Brink's Armored Car Depot in Rochester, New York, the fifth largest robbery in US history. Four men, Sam Millar, Patrick Moloney, former Rochester Police officer Thomas O'Connor, and Charles McCormick, all of whom had ties to the Provisional Irish Republican Army, were accused.

2008 "D.B. Tuber's" Brinks robbery 

On September 30, 2008, in Monroe, Washington, a Brink's armored car pulled up to make a delivery to the Bank of America. A landscaper, who was working the grounds and wearing a blue shirt, blue hat, and yellow safety vest, approached the armored car guard, pepper-sprayed him, stole $400,000 in cash, and escaped on an inner tube on the nearby Woods Creek. When police arrived, they found the bank's parking lot was full of men wearing clothing identical to the mysterious robber's. All were "hired" by a phony ad, placed on Craigslist by a culprit the media dubbed "D.B. Tuber" (after famed hijacker, D. B. Cooper), instructing them to show up at the bank at the same time, wearing a blue shirt, blue hat, and yellow safety vest. Months later, the FBI received a tip from a very attentive homeless man who had witnessed a "practice run" weeks prior to the robbery. DNA evidence later convicted former college football player Anthony Curcio of the crime.

2013 Brussels Airport diamond heist 

On 18 February 2013, eight masked gunmen, in two cars with police markings, stole approximately €38 million worth of diamonds by attacking in a very small time window during which they were being transferred from a Brink's armored van to a Swiss-bound Fokker 100 operated by Helvetic Airways. The Fokker 100 was on the apron at Brussels Airport, Belgium, just before 20:00 CET. The heist was accomplished without a shot being fired.

2014 return of lost money bag 

In May 2014, California resident Joe Cornell found a Brink's bag with $125,000 inside; Cornell saw the bag of cash accidentally fall out of the back of a Brink's transport car as it drove over the railroad tracks in downtown Fresno. Cornell returned the bag of cash claiming, "it was the right thing to do." Brinks thanked the man for his honesty with a $5,000 reward and a $5,000 donation in Cornell's name to the Salvation Army, where he works.

2022 Lebec Flying J Heist 
On July 11, 2022 approximately $100M to $150M worth of jewelry, luxury watches, and other valuables were stolen at around 2:00 a.m. from a Brink's truck within a 27-minute window whilst the driver and guard were at a Flying J rest stop on I-5 in Lebec, California; one had absented the vehicle while the other slept. The merchandise, which had been loaded the day before in San Francisco, was en route to a trade show in Pasadena under the aegis of International Gem and Jewelry Show. As is common industry practice such valuables are under-insured, partially because extra insurance is extremely expensive, but mostly due of Brink's reputation for trustworthiness and security. Several exhibitors, "mom-and-pop" operations, effectively lost their livelihoods. The incident remains under investigation by the FBI and the Los Angeles Sheriffs Department's Major Crimes Bureau, and the Brink's crew is co-operating with authorities.

Recent corporate developments 

In October 2015, Brink's activist investor Starboard Value LP announced it had raised its stake in the company to around 12.4%. Later that year, Brink's responded to Texas RFI 212P with their perspective on a solution for Texas HB 483, establishing the Texas Bullion Depository.

In April 2017, it was announced that Brinks had chosen the FN Herstal FN 509 9mm to be the new sidearm for their armed guards.

In August 2018, Brinks Inc. acquired Dunbar Armored for $520 million.

References 
 7. Annual Report for fiscal year ending December 31, 2012

External links 

 
 Official Canadian Site
 Brink's, Incorporated Website
 BAX Global Website
 
 Brinks SEC Filings

1859 establishments in Illinois
American companies established in 1859
Business services companies established in 1859
Companies based in Richmond, Virginia
Companies listed on the New York Stock Exchange
Logistics companies of Canada
Logistics companies of the United States
Security companies of Canada
Security companies of the United States
Transport companies established in 1859